The College of Technology and Museum Extension in Byrom Street, Liverpool, England, was built between 1896 and 1901, the architect was Edward William Mountford. The building was constructed to provide a new College of Technology and an extension to the museum. The college occupied the lower levels and the museum the upper levels.  Bomb damage led to some reconstruction work in the 1960s. The building is Grade II* listed.

The lower levels were taken over by Liverpool Polytechnic and its successor Liverpool John Moores University. Initially, they held the engineering department but were subsequently split between the Sports Science and Computing Services departments, being home to the University's DEC and VAX computers.

More recently, during the transformation of Liverpool Museum into World Museum Liverpool, the museum acquired the remainder of the building which now houses its research department.

See also
 Architecture of Liverpool

References

External links

 https://web.archive.org/web/20050507040103/http://www.liverpoolpictorial.co.uk/liverpoolphotographs/museum.html 
 https://web.archive.org/web/20050409221232/http://www.liverpoolworldheritage.com/williambrownstreet.asp

Grade II* listed buildings in Liverpool
Grade II* listed museum buildings
Museums in Liverpool